Pál Szalma (born 12 March 1982 in Vásárosnamény) is a Hungarian association football goalkeeper. He currently plays for Balmazújvárosi FC.

References
Nemzeti Sport 
HLSZ 

1982 births
Living people
People from Vásárosnamény
Association football goalkeepers
Hungarian footballers
Hungary youth international footballers
Nyíregyháza Spartacus FC players
Záhonyi VSC players
Nyírbátori FC players
Diósgyőri VTK players
Újpest FC players
Jászberényi SE footballers
BFC Siófok players
Balmazújvárosi FC players
Nemzeti Bajnokság I players
Sportspeople from Szabolcs-Szatmár-Bereg County